This list of National Park Service areas in Massachusetts describes the regions and properties of the state of Massachusetts in which the United States National Park Service (NPS) has an interest.  Some of the sites are owned an operated by the NPS, while others, especially those covering significant geographic areas or involving multiple properties, may be only owned or operated in part by the NPS.  In some cases, the NPS acts strictly in an advisory or coordinating capacity, and does not provide a services in the form of rangers, visitor centers, or maintenance that it normally provides for the properties it owns or operates.

Notes

Landmarks in Massachusetts
National Parks